It's My Time may refer to:

 It's My Time (Jeanie Tracy album)
 It's My Time (Tito El Bambino album)
 "It's My Time" (Jade Ewen song), the British entry in the 2009 Eurovision Song Contest
 "It's My Time" (Martina McBride song)
 "It's My Time" (Prince Royce song)
 "It's My Time", by Clint Mansell from Black Swan: Original Motion Picture Soundtrack
 "It's My Time", by The Mynah Birds
 "It's My Time", by Scorcher
 "It's My Time", by The Everly Brothers

See also 
 My Time (disambiguation)